Statistics of Japan Soccer League for the 1980 season. For the first time ever, automatic promotion and relegation was introduced for the first and last places of the Second Division, which means that the last place in the First Division went down.

First Division
Yanmar Diesel won the title for a fourth time.

Nissan, who had saved itself from relegation in the playout the previous season, went down after the bottom place was granted automatic relegation, while Yamaha saved itself by beating Fujitsu in the playout.

Promotion/relegation Series

Second Division
Honda was finally promoted on the second attempt after the 1978 debacle.

Kofu Club saved itself from relegation by defeating Furukawa Electric Chiba, Furukawa's B-team. Cosmo Oil Yokkaichi fell through and went back to the Tokai regional league.

Promotion/relegation Series

References
Japan - List of final tables (RSSSF)

Japan Soccer League seasons
1
Jap
Jap